The  is a "Rapid" limited-stop train service in Japan operated by East Japan Railway Company (JR East) and Aoimori Railway Company, which runs from  to  via the Aoimori Railway Line and the Ōminato Line.

Service pattern
There are three daily round trip services to Hachinohe.

Station list

History

Semi express (1961–1965)
This was discontinued on 30 September 1965, replaced by the Michinoku service.

Express (1966–1982)
This was discontinued on 14 November 1982.

Rapid (1993–present)

See also
List of named passenger trains of Japan

References

Named passenger trains of Japan
East Japan Railway Company
Aoimori Railway Line
Rail transport in Aomori Prefecture
Railway services introduced in 1961
Railway services introduced in 1993
1961 establishments in Japan
1993 establishments in Japan